John Nielsen may refer to:

John Nielsen (footballer, born 1911)
John Nielsen (footballer, born 1946), Danish player
John Nielsen (footballer, born 1972), Danish player
John Nielsen (racing driver) (born 1956), Danish auto racer
John M. Nielson (born 1943), American minister in the Church of the Nazarene
John Nielsen (born 1961), American nature writer and NPR science reporter, see National Outdoor Book Award

See also
John Neilson (disambiguation)
John Nielsen-Gammon (born 1962), American meteorologist, climatologist and academic
Timothy John Nielsen (born 1968), English-born Australian first-class cricketer
Nielsen (disambiguation)